Teddy Robin and the Playboys was a 1960s Hong Kong English pop band. The most notable members were Teddy Robin (vocals/guitar), who has a successful career as a singer/songwriter, actor, and filmmaker; and Norman Cheng (lead guitar), who later became a top executive in charge of Polydor Records' Southeast Asian operations in the 1970s, and is the father of actor/singer Ronald Cheng. Other members included Teddy Robin's two brothers, Raymond and William Kwan, on rhythm guitar and bass, respectively; Frederick Chan on drums; and later, Ricky Chan on keyboards. Their first EP, "Lies" b/w "Six Days in May", was released in 1966. Other popular cover hits included "Pretty Blue Eyes", "Lies", and "Carousel".

Discography

Studio albums 
 1967 - Not All Lies
 1967 - Breakthrough
 1968 - 365 Days
 1968 - Memories

EPs 
 1966 - "Lies" b/w "Six Days in May"

Compilations 
 1969 - The Best Of... 
 2005 - The 'In' Sounds of Hong Kong! 
 2008 - Teddy Robin & The Playboys

References

Hong Kong musical groups